Norman Arthur Erbe (October 25, 1919 – June 8, 2000) was the 35th governor of Iowa, holding the position from 1961 to 1963.

Biography

He was born in Boone, Iowa. He served as an infantry officer in the United States Army from 1941 to 1943. He then transferred to the United States Army Air Forces as a pilot, spending the rest of World War II as a pilot. After the war, he studied at the University of Iowa, obtaining a law degree in 1947. He entered state politics, serving as Iowa Attorney General from 1957 to 1961 before succeeding Herschel C. Loveless as governor.  In the 1962 election he was defeated for re-election by Harold E. Hughes. He hosted the world premiere of the motion picture  Meredith Willson's  The Music Man (1962 film) in Mason City, Iowa. 
After leaving politics, he served as Executive Vice-President of the Associated Builders and Contractors in 1979. He published his memoirs, Ringside at the Fireworks, in 1997. He died on June 8, 2000, and is buried in the Linwood Park cemetery in Boone, Iowa.

Erbe presided over the last two state executions in Iowa, that of Charles Brown and Charles Kelley. In a 1995 interview, Erbe said that while he had no second thoughts over the executions, he did not believe capital punishment was a deterrent.

See also 
 List of Iowa attorneys general
 List of governors of Iowa

References

External links 
 National Governors Association Biography: Norman Arthur Erbe

1919 births
2000 deaths
American Lutherans
Republican Party governors of Iowa
Iowa Attorneys General
People from Boone, Iowa
United States Army officers
United States Army Air Forces officers
United States Army Air Forces pilots of World War II
University of Iowa College of Law alumni
20th-century American politicians
20th-century Lutherans
Military personnel from Iowa